The WMF World Cup is an international indoor soccer competition contested by the senior men's national teams of the members of World Minifootball Federation (WMF).

History
The first Indoor Soccer World Championship was organized in 1997 in Mexico City, under the auspices of the Federacion Internacional de Futbol Rapido (FIFRA). Twelve national teams participated in that tournament, with Mexico winning the final against the United States.

In February 2012, the Federación Internacional de Fútbol Rápido hosted the first-ever FIFRA Club Championship in Monterrey, Mexico. The 4-team tournament was won by the San Diego Sockers, who defeated the Monterrey Flash 5–3 in the final.

The first edition of the World Minifootball Federation World Cup was held in the United States in March 2015.

WMF awarded the second edition in 2017 of the competition to the Tunisia Minifootball Federation. The tournament was held from 6 to 15 October 2017.

The 2023 WMF World Cup will be played from 28 April till 6 May 2023.

Results

Medal table

Participating nations
 
 
 
 
 — Hosts

References

External links
 World Minifootball Federation website

 
Minifootball
World championships in association football
Biennial sporting events
Recurring sporting events established in 2015